Demetria terragena is a species of bacteria. Its cells are gram-positive, not acid fast, non-motile, non-sporulating, irregular coccoid to short rod-shaped and 	microaerophilic.

References

Further reading
 Whitman, William B., et al., eds. Bergey's manual® of systematic bacteriology. Vol. 5. Springer, 2012.

External links 

Type strain of Demetria terragena at BacDive -  the Bacterial Diversity Metadatabase

Micrococcales
Bacteria described in 1997
Monotypic bacteria genera